Start was a Soviet 35 mm single-lens reflex camera produced by the Mechanical Factory of Krasnogorsk (KMZ) from 1958 through 1964. The camera was inspired by the Exakta camera. The Start used bayonet-mounted lenses and had an Exakta-style shutter release arm, a KMZ Helios 44-58 mm 2 lens, and a cloth focal-panel shutter.

An improved version, the Start-2, was produced ca. 1963–1964, featuring an automatic diaphragm and a metered prism.

Notes

References 
 

Soviet cameras